Gold & Wood is a manufacturer of high-end hand-crafted eyeglasses and sunglasses.

The company was founded in 1995 by Maurice Leonard and has its production facilities in Luxembourg.

Gold & Wood uses precious materials like diamonds, gold, wood taken from authorised and supervised plantations, and buffalo horn from animals that are not harmed in the process, with their horns growing back.

Awards 

Gold & Wood has been nominated for and won numerous industry awards, like the prestigious Silmo d'Or for its "Moon" and "Star" sunglasses.

Celebrities 

Celebrities known for wearing the brand have included Angelina Jolie, Jamie Foxx, Shaquille O'Neal , Jose Canseco, Shane West , Traci Bingham , Tommy Davidson, Tim Cook, Samuel L. Jackson, Snoop Dogg and fashion designer Christian Siriano, to name a few.

Collaborations 

In 2009, Gold & Wood unveiled a new eyewear collection for the high-end jewelry brand Boucheron.

References

External links
 Gold-and-Wood.com
 20/20 Magazine

Manufacturing companies established in 1995
Manufacturing companies of Luxembourg
Eyewear brands of Luxembourg
Brands of Luxembourg
Eyewear companies of Luxembourg